Andrew Gregg (June 10, 1755May 20, 1835) was an American politician. A Democratic-Republican, he served as a United States Senator for Pennsylvania from 1807 until 1813. Prior to that, he served as a U.S. Representative from 1791 until 1807. From June to December 1809, he served briefly as President pro tempore of the United States Senate.

Gregg was born on June 10, 1755, in Carlisle in the Province of Pennsylvania. His father was Andrew Gregg (1710–1789), and his mother was Jane Scott (1725–1783). He married Martha Potter the daughter of Major General James Potter who was a vice president of the state of Pennsylvania. The couple had 11 children. His son, Andrew Gregg, Jr., built the Andrew Gregg Homestead about 1825.  His father, also named Andrew Gregg, was a member of the Paxton Boys.

He served as a United States Congressman from Pennsylvania from 1791 until 1813: first, in the United States House of Representatives from October 24, 1791, until March 4, 1807, and then in the United States Senate from October 26, 1807, until March 4, 1813. During part of his service in the Senate, he served as President pro tempore. 
Later in life, he was appointed secretary of state for Pennsylvania, in 1816, and ran unsuccessfully for Governor of Pennsylvania in 1823. Prior to his election to the United States Congress, he had served in the militia during the American Revolution, and had been a tutor at the College of Philadelphia, from 1779 to 1783. His grandsons Andrew Gregg Curtin and James Xavier McLanahan were also prominent Pennsylvania politicians.

Gregg died May 20, 1835, in Bellefonte, Pennsylvania, in Centre County, at the age of 79, and was buried in Union Cemetery.

Two Pennsylvania townships are named after Gregg, one in Centre County, and one in Union County (previously part of Lycoming County).

References

Sources

1755 births
1835 deaths
United States senators from Pennsylvania
University of Pennsylvania people
People from Carlisle, Pennsylvania
People from Centre County, Pennsylvania
Democratic-Republican Party United States senators
Burials in Pennsylvania
Democratic-Republican Party members of the United States House of Representatives from Pennsylvania
People of colonial Pennsylvania
Presidents pro tempore of the United States Senate
Deans of the United States House of Representatives